MRA may refer to:

Medicine and science 
 Magnetic resonance angiography
 Mineralocorticoid receptor antagonist
 Monoamine releasing agent
 Multiresolution analysis

Organisations 
 Maharashtra Rationalist Association, an organisation in India
 Marketing Research Association
 Mauritius Revenue Authority
 Metal Roofing Alliance
 Metropolitan Redevelopment Authority of Western Australia
 Microcredit Regulatory Authority
 Monland Restoration Army
 Moral Re-Armament
 Mountain Rescue Association
 Mugi Rekso Abadi, a media company in Indonesia
 Myanmar Restaurant Association
 Madison-Ridgeland Academy
 Royal Museum of the Armed Forces and Military History (abbreviated MRA in French), a museum in Belgium

Other 
 Mail retrieval agent
 Market reduction approach
 Member's Representational Allowance in the United States House of Representatives
 Men's Rights Activist (or men's rights activism)
 Minimum reception altitude
 Mutant registration acts (comics)
 Mutual recognition agreement

See also